Saveetha Amaravati University is  a private university located in Vijayawada, Andhra Pradesh, India. Established in 2018, it is the third private university to be established in Amaravati, following SRM University, Andhra Pradesh and VIT-AP University. The university offers undergraduate studies in health sciences.

References

External links

Private universities in India
Universities in Andhra Pradesh
Universities and colleges in Guntur district
Amaravati
Educational institutions established in 2018
2018 establishments in Andhra Pradesh